Sephiroth may refer to:

Sefirot, a concept in Kabbalah
Sephiroth, the main antagonist in Final Fantasy VII